The 2016 Sacramento State Hornets football team represented California State University, Sacramento as a member of the Big Sky Conference during the 2016 NCAA Division I FCS football season. Led by third-year head coach Jody Sears, Sacramento State compiled an overall record of 2–9 with a mark of 2–6 in conference play, placing in a four-way tie for ninth in the Big Sky. The Hornets played home games at Hornet Stadium in Sacramento, California.

Schedule

Despite Weber State also being a member of the Big Sky Conference, the September 17 game against Sacramento State was considered a non-conference game.

Game summaries

Western Oregon

at Fresno State

at Weber State

at Idaho State

Montana State

North Dakota

at Montana

at Northern Colorado

Cal Poly

Portland State

at UC Davis

References

Sacramento State
Sacramento State Hornets football seasons
Sacramento State Hornets football